Andreas Evjen (born 25 May 1969) is a Norwegian former footballer who played as a defender.

He spent his career in Mjølner, Bodø/Glimt and Start, amassing 150 Eliteserien games for Bodø/Glimt.

He is the brother of footballer Thomas Evjen and father of Henrik and Håkon Evjen (twins), whom he also coached. He has also sat on Mjølner's sports committee.

References

1969 births
Living people
People from Narvik
Sportspeople from Nordland
Norwegian footballers
Association football defenders
Eliteserien players
Norwegian First Division players
FK Mjølner players
FK Bodø/Glimt players
IK Start players